USS YP-279 was a United States Navy district patrol craft during World War II.

The ship was built by the Campbell Machine Company of San Diego as a   tuna seiner. Delivered in August 1929, she operated under the name Navigator until requisitioned by the United States Navy in 1942, and commissioned as the yard patrol craft USS YP-279.

The ship foundered in heavy weather off Townsville, Australia, on 5 September 1943.

External links

1929 ships
Ships built in San Diego
World War II patrol vessels of the United States
Maritime incidents in September 1943
World War II shipwrecks in the Pacific Ocean
Shipwrecks of Queensland